Razaviyeh-ye Abkhvorak (also Romanized as Raẕavīyeh-ye Ābkhvorak; also known as Ab Khorak, Ābkhowr, Ābkhūr, Ab Khūrak, Āb Khvor, and Ābkhvorak) is a village in Dastgerdan Rural District, Dastgerdan District, Tabas County, South Khorasan Province, Iran. At the 2006 census, its population was 202, in 87 families.

References 

Populated places in Tabas County